Tour Euralille is an office skyscraper in Euralille, the business district of the Lille metropolitan area.

Designed by Jean-Claude Burdèse and Claude Vasconi, 110 m high, it is the second tallest tower in Lille after the Tour de Lille.
The Tour Euralille and its atrium span the Lille-Europe station, which represented a real technical challenge during its construction. The mixed structure of the tower, produced by the company Rabot Dutilleul Construction, consists of a reinforced concrete ladder beam which is supported by a metal frame supporting the suspended floors.

See also 
 List of tallest buildings in France

References

External links 
 Tour Lilleurope

Euralille
Lille
Office buildings completed in 1995
20th-century architecture in France